Opus mixtum (Latin: "mixed work"), or opus vagecum and opus compositum, was an ancient Roman construction technique. It can consist in a mix of opus reticulatum and at the angles and the sides of opus latericium. 

It can also consist of opus vittatum and opus testaceum. 

Opus mixtum was used in particular during the age of Emperor Hadrian (2nd century AD).

See also

Jublains archeological site -the forum there is an example

Roman construction techniques